A (Plant)natural rope is a rope that is made from natural fibers. These fibers are obtained from organic material (such as materials produced by plants). Natural ropes suffer from many problems including susceptibility to rotting, degradation, mildew and wear out very quickly.

Materials 
Cotton, sisal, manila, coir, and papyrus are materials that can be used to create a natural rope.

Disadvantages compared to synthetic ropes 
Natural ropes suffer from many problems when compared to synthetic ropes. Natural ropes have a susceptibility to rot, degrade, and mildew. Natural ropes also wear out very quickly  and lose much of their strength when placed in water.

See also 
 Synthetic rope
 Fiber rope
 Wire rope

References

Materials